Cercles is a former commune in the Dordogne department in Nouvelle-Aquitaine in southwestern France. On 1 January 2017, it was merged into the new commune La Tour-Blanche-Cercles.

History
From 1825 to 1877, the nearby town of La Chapelle-Montabourlet was incorporated into Cercles.

Population

See also
Communes of the Dordogne department

References

Former communes of Dordogne